The 10th Asian Film Awards are the 2016 edition of the Asian Film Awards. The ceremony was held at the Venetian Theatre in The Venetian Casino and Hotel in Macau.

Winners and nominees
Winners are listed first and highlighted in bold.

References

External links

Asian Film Awards ceremonies
2016 film awards
2016 in Macau
Film
Hong Kong